José Mateo Gil (16 March 1928 – 27 August 2019) was a Spanish racing cyclist. He rode in the 1955 Tour de France.

References

External links
 

1928 births
2019 deaths
Spanish male cyclists
People from Berguedà
Sportspeople from the Province of Barcelona
Cyclists from Catalonia
20th-century Spanish people